Karen Lee Orzolek (born November 22, 1978) is a South Korean-born American singer, musician, and songwriter. She is the lead vocalist for the indie rock band Yeah Yeah Yeahs.

Early life 
She was born in Seoul, South Korea, the daughter of a Korean mother and a Polish father. The family eventually moved to Englewood, New Jersey, where she grew up and graduated from The Elisabeth Morrow School and Dwight-Englewood School. About her childhood, she stated that "it's almost embarrassing how well-behaved I was, which is probably why I do things like spit water on myself on stage as an adult". She attended Oberlin College before transferring to New York University's Tisch School of the Arts.

Career 
O is known as the lead vocalist for the band Yeah Yeah Yeahs. She has also been noted for her sense of fashion, wearing ostentatious outfits made by her friend, fashion designer Christian Joy. In the early days of the band, she became well-known for her outrageous antics during live shows. Their first ever gig was opening for the White Stripes in 2000.

During a tour for the 2003 Livid Festival in Australia, at a sideshow at The Metro in Sydney, O accidentally danced off the stage and was reluctantly taken to a hospital. A few days later, at the Sydney leg of the Livid Festival, she appeared in a wheelchair pushed onstage by Angus Andrew.

In 2007, O was placed at number three on Spinner's "Women Who Rock Right Now" list. The following year, she debuted a side project called Native Korean Rock with fellow New York City musicians, with two intimate performances at Union Pool in Brooklyn on July 21.

In 2009, she contributed backing vocals, screaming animal sounds, and noises to the songs "Gemini Syringes", "I Can Be A Frog", and "Watching the Planets" on The Flaming Lips album Embryonic. In 2011, she contributed vocals on the song "Pinky's Dream" on the David Lynch debut album Crazy Clown Time. In 2012, she collaborated with experimental rock group Swans on the song "Song for a Warrior" on their album The Seer. She also lends vocals to the song "GO!" on Santigold's 2012 album Master of My Make-Believe.

On the collaboration project with N.A.S.A. on The Spirit of Apollo, she appears on the track "Strange Enough", together with Ol' Dirty Bastard and Fatlip. O's vocal approach has been described as "ethereal", and has been described as "yelping" at times. She described her approach:

O has also collaborated with James Iha on his second solo LP Look to the Sky in 2012. In 2014, Target used a version of the song "A Marshmallow World" sung by O. In 2015 she did a remake of Animotion's Obsession, written by legendary songwriter, Holly Knight for a new STARZ show, Flesh and Bone. On May 5, 2015, a song by Karen O in tribute to Nellie Bly was used as part of a Google doodle commemorating Bly's 151st birthday. The same year, Microsoft approached O to pen a theme song for Square Enix's game Rise of the Tomb Raider, which resulted in the song "I Shall Rise".

Soundtrack work 
O was featured in the track "Cut Me Up" by Har Mar Superstar for the soundtrack to the 2005 horror film House of Wax. For the movie Jackass 2, O collaborated with electronic artist Peaches and Johnny Knoxville to record a track entitled "Backass"; for Jackass 3D, she covered Roger Alan Wade's "If You're Gonna Be Dumb" under the alternative title of "If You're Gonna Be Dumb, You Gotta Be Tough". In 2007, she also contributed vocals to a version of Bob Dylan's "Highway 61 Revisited" for the I'm Not There film soundtrack. At the end of episode 409, "Brothers Cinco", of the Tim and Eric Awesome Show, Great Job! she performed a short song. She also has a song titled "Strange Love" on the album "Frankenweenie Unleashed!"

O collaborated with Trent Reznor and Atticus Ross on a cover version of Led Zeppelin's "Immigrant Song" for the soundtrack to the 2011 film The Girl with the Dragon Tattoo, for which Reznor and Ross composed the score. In December 2011, it was announced that the song would open the soundtrack album, be released as the opening single, and be available free to all who pre-ordered before the official release date of December 9.

Work with Spike Jonze 
O and Spike Jonze collaborated on a 2005 Adidas commercial, Hello Tomorrow, after Jonze had directed the video for the Yeah Yeah Yeahs' 2004 single "Y Control". O composed all songs on the soundtrack of Jonze's film Where the Wild Things Are (with the exception of a cover of the Daniel Johnston song "Worried Shoes") in collaboration with Carter Burwell. She is listed on the soundtrack as "Karen O and the Kids". The song "All Is Love", written by O and Nick Zinner and included in this soundtrack, was nominated for the Grammy Award for Best Song Written for a Motion Picture, Television or Other Visual Media, a songwriter's award, at the 2010 Grammy Awards.

O also contributed "The Moon Song" to Jonze's 2013 film Her. O and Jonze were nominated in 2014 for an Academy Award for Best Original Song for "The Moon Song".

Video work 
In 2004, O, using the moniker Marshmellow, directed the music video for "We Fenced Other Gardens with the Bones of Our Own" by Liars, fronted by her then-boyfriend Angus Andrew. The following year, she directed the "Blessed Evening" video for Foetus with her then-boyfriend Spike Jonze working as cinematographer. In 2006, she directed the Yeah Yeah Yeahs video for "Cheated Hearts".

Under the moniker Kids with Canes, O and her now-husband Barnaby Clay directed the music video for the Tiny Masters of Today song "Hologram World", released in 2008. O also contributed vocals to the song and served as choreographer of the video, in which she appears with Yeah Yeah Yeahs bandmates Nick Zinner and Brian Chase, as well as Mike D from the Beastie Boys, Gibby Haynes from the Butthole Surfers, Russell Simins from the Blues Explosion, and Sam James from The Mooney Suzuki.

KO at Home demo leak 
On December 10, 2006, a home-recorded album titled KO at Home was leaked via an invite-only BitTorrent tracking site. The album, originally a personal gift to Dave Sitek of TV on the Radio, was discovered inside a suitcase that Sitek had left behind in a New York City apartment. The disc's 14 tracks and scan of the cover (a photograph of O with a poem written by Oscar Wilde on the back side of the photo) quickly spread. News sites broke the story of the leak when Sitek lashed out at the fan who leaked the demos. Eventually, Sitek followed up his comments with an apology letter. In response to the leak, O said that "shit happens", and although she was "a little grossed out", she offered commentary on which of the songs she liked the most.

Solo career 
O's debut solo album, Crush Songs, was released on September 9, 2014. It was released on Cult Records via Kobalt Label Services. On February 17, 2015, O released a live album titled Live from Crush Palace, recorded during three shows at Hollywood Forever Cemetery's Masonic Lodge in Los Angeles in September 2014. The album features live renditions of songs from Crush Songs, as well as "Hideaway" from Where the Wild Things Are and "The Moon Song" from Her. On January 11, 2018, O released the song "Yo! My Saint", featuring guest vocals from Michael Kiwanuka, in support of Kenzo's Spring Summer 2018 collection. In 2023, Rolling Stone ranked O at number 184 on its list of the 200 Greatest Singers of All Time.

Lux Prima 

Lux Prima is the collaborative album from Karen O and musician-producer Danger Mouse, released March 15, 2019. The two originally met to discuss collaboration in 2007 as mutual admirers, but did not collaborate until 2016 due to scheduling and availability, resulting in the album Lux Prima three years later.

An Encounter with Lux Prima 

"An Encounter with Lux Prima" was an immersive art piece and communal listening experience soundtracked by Karen O and Danger Mouse's collaborative album Lux Prima. The installation premiered at Los Angeles' Marciano Art Foundation in April 2019, where it played to sold-out audiences. The piece saw the duo collaborate with a number of artists, including creative director Barnaby Clay, sound designer Ren Klyce, lighting designer Tobias Rylander and visual artist Davy Evans, in collaboration with George Lucas' Skywalker Sound and Meyer Sound on audio design and build, as well as MSG's Obscura Digital on projection mapping.

Personal life 
O has dated Spike Jonze and Liars lead singer Angus Andrew, the latter of whom was the subject of the Yeah Yeah Yeahs' song "Maps". In December 2011, she married director Barnaby Clay. Their son Django was born in August 2015.

Discography

Studio albums 
 Crush Songs (2014)
 Lux Prima (2019) with Danger Mouse

Live albums 
 Live from Crush Palace (2015)

Soundtrack albums 
 Where the Wild Things Are: Motion Picture Soundtrack  (2009)

Singles

As lead artist

As featured artist

Other charted songs

Guest appearances

Awards 
In 2006, O was nominated for the GAFFA-Prisen Award for Best Foreign Female Act.

O was nominated for the Academy Award for Best Original Song for co-writing "The Moon Song" with Spike Jonze for the film Her.

Notes

References

External links 

 

1978 births
20th-century American singers
21st-century American singers
American women rock singers
American women singer-songwriters
American indie rock musicians
American musicians of Korean descent
American people of Polish descent
Dwight-Englewood School alumni
Living people
Musicians from Busan
Musicians from Seoul
NME Awards winners
Oberlin College alumni
People from Englewood, New Jersey
Singer-songwriters from New Jersey
Singers from New York City
South Korean emigrants to the United States
Tisch School of the Arts alumni
Yeah Yeah Yeahs members
20th-century American women singers
21st-century American women singers
Cult Records artists
Singer-songwriters from New York (state)
Women in punk